Kenyentulus kenyanus is a species of proturan in the family Acerentomidae. It is found in Africa, Australia, the Caribbean Sea, South America, and Southern Asia.

References

Further reading

 

Protura
Articles created by Qbugbot
Animals described in 1948